Carnal knowledge is a euphemism for sexual intercourse. It may also refer to:
Carnal Knowledge (film) (1971), directed by Mike Nichols
Carnal Knowledge (game show) (1996)

See also
For Unlawful Carnal Knowledge (1991), music album by Van Halen